Dan Carr Bowling, II (born November 16, 1946) is an American politician of the Democratic Party. He is a former member of the Virginia House of Delegates. He represented the 3rd district in the southwest part of the state, including Buchanan County and parts of Russell and Tazewell Counties. He was defeated by Will Morefield in his bid for reelection on November 3, 2009.

Notes

References

Delegate Dan Bowling: Serving The Third House District of Virginia (Constituent website)

External links

1946 births
Living people
Democratic Party members of the Virginia House of Delegates
Southwest Virginia Community College alumni
Bluefield State College alumni
Virginia Tech alumni
People from Tazewell County, Virginia
People from Bluefield, West Virginia
21st-century American politicians